Clivina oodnadattae is a species of ground beetle in the subfamily Scaritinae. It was described by Blackburn in 1894.

References

oodnadattae
Beetles described in 1894